Aravane Rezaï was the defending champion, but she chose not to participate this year.

Top-seeded Maria Sharapova won in the final 7–5, 6–1 against Kristina Barrois.

Seeds

Draw

Finals

Top half

Bottom half

References
Main draw
Qualifying draw

Internationaux de Strasbourg - Singles
Internationaux de Strasbourg
2010 in French tennis